The Atlanta School of Composers is a group of contemporary classical music composers championed by Atlanta Symphony Orchestra and conductor Robert Spano through performances, recordings, and commissions. Members of the group include Jennifer Higdon, Christopher Theofanidis, Osvaldo Golijov, and Michael Gandolfi, with Adam Schoenberg added in June 2010. Works from the group including the following:

 The Here and Now by Theofanidis – recorded in 2003
 Concerto for Orchestra and City Scape by Higdon – recorded in 2004
 The opera Ainadamar by Golijov – recorded in 2006
 Garden of Cosmic Speculation by Gandolfi – performed in May 2007 and recorded that same year
 Oceana by Golijov – recorded in 2007
 Dooryard Bloom by Higdon – recorded in 2009
  On a Wire by Higdon and QED: Engaging Richard Feynman by Gandolfi – premiered together in June 2010

External links 

 The Atlanta School of Composers at the Atlanta Symphony Orchestra web site
 New Music With a Tonal Twist – article about the Atlanta School of Composers at The Wall Street Journal web site
 Mass Classical: America, Accessibility, and the Atlanta School of Composers (MA Thesis) Comprehensive history and analysis

Composition schools